Harrison Henry Atwood (August 26, 1863 – October 22, 1954) was an American architect and politician who represented Boston in the United States House of Representatives from 1895 to 1897 and for several nonconsecutive terms in the Massachusetts House of Representatives. He was a member of the Republican Party but was also supported by the Progressive Party during his later terms in the Massachusetts House.

Biography
Born at the home of his grandmother in North Londonderry, Vermont, Atwood attended the public schools of Boston, Massachusetts. He studied architecture and engaged in that profession in Boston. Atwood was elected as a Republican to the Fifty-fourth Congress (March 4, 1895 – March 3, 1897).  Atwood defeated incumbent Democrat Michael J. McEttrick. He was a member of the Republican State Committee.

Atwood  was an unsuccessful candidate for renomination in 1896 to the Fifty-fifth Congress. He resumed his former profession in Boston. From 1888 to 1894 he was a member of and secretary to the Boston Republican City Committee. From 1889 to 1890 he was City Architect of Boston, designing the Bowditch School, the Congress Street Fire Station, and the Harvard Avenue Fire Station, all on the National Register of Historic Places. Atwood also designed several churches for the Roman Catholic Archdiocese of Boston.
He was again a member of the Massachusetts House of Representatives in 1915, 1917, 1918, 1923, 1924, 1927, and 1928.

He was an unsuccessful candidate for election in 1918 to the Sixty-sixth Congress.
He resumed his profession as an architect in Boston, Massachusetts.
He moved to Wellesley Hills, Massachusetts, in April 1938.
He died in Boston, Massachusetts, October 22, 1954.
He was interred in Forest Hills Cemetery.

Buildings on the National Register of Historic Places designed by H.H. Atwood

See also
 1915 Massachusetts legislature
 1917 Massachusetts legislature
 1918 Massachusetts legislature
 1923–1924 Massachusetts legislature

References

Bibliography

Official Congressional Directory By United States Congress

1863 births
1954 deaths
People from Londonderry, Vermont
Republican Party members of the United States House of Representatives from Massachusetts
Republican Party members of the Massachusetts House of Representatives
Architects of Roman Catholic churches
20th-century American architects
Burials at Forest Hills Cemetery (Boston)
19th-century American architects